Sanicula maritima is a rare species of flowering plant in the parsley family known by the common names adobe snakeroot and adobe sanicle.

Distribution
The plant is endemic to California, where it is known from just a few occurrences on the Central Coast.

Its habitat includes moist coastal meadows and canyons.

Description
Sanicula maritima is a perennial herb growing to a maximum height near 40 centimeters from a taproot. The green to yellowish leaves are simple or divided into a number of lobes, smooth-edged or toothed.

The inflorescence is made up of one or more heads of bisexual and male-only flowers with tiny, curving, yellow petals.

The prickly fruits are about half a centimeter long each.

References

External links
Calflora Database: Sanicula maritima (Adobe snakeroot, Adobe sanicle)
Jepson Manual Treatment
USDA Plants Profile
U.C. Photos gallery

maritima
Endemic flora of California
Natural history of the California chaparral and woodlands
Taxa named by Sereno Watson
Critically endangered flora of California